Adelaide is a rural town and farming area in the Eastern Cape Province of South Africa. Adelaide is situated at the foothills of the Great Winterberg mountain range, 22 km east of Bedford and 37 km west of Fort Beaufort.

History

Before European arrival 
The modern day area of Adelaide was first inhabited by Bushmen and Xhosa people (estimated around 1530 to 1760), but in the late 18th and 19th century white farmer settlers arrived here. Some Bushmen were displaced while some intermarried with Xhosa people such as the Gqunukhwebe, Gqwashu and Sukwini people.

Colonial Adelaide 
Adelaide's origins date back to 1835 when a British officer named Captain Alexander Boswell Armstrong (1787–1862) established a military encampment which he named Fort Adelaide after Adelaide of Saxe-Meiningen, wife of King William IV. Despite the earlier English settlers, who were part of the 1820 Settlers, later on a large number of both Scottish and Afrikaans people soon immigrated here too. The Scottish were also the first to erect a church in the local area.

Modern day Adelaide 
Adelaide is an important centre for wool and sheep farming. Beef, mutton, venison, and citrus fruit are also important products. The specialised abattoir for venison (farm-hunted game meat) operating in the central town provides much needed employment to the local residents.

About 2,300 of the San-Bushmen's faraway descendants, the Westernised Coloureds, reside in the Bezuidenhoutville township 3 km from the central town, and represent 19% of Adelaide's inhabitants. Lingelethu is the largest Black African township in Adelaide, with a census exceeding 6,000 and a population share of 77% of the municipal area.

References

Populated places in the Raymond Mhlaba Local Municipality
Tourist attractions in the Eastern Cape